Prince Eugen of Bavaria (16 July 1925 – 1 January 1997) was a member of the Bavarian Royal House of Wittelsbach.

Early life
Prince Eugen was born in Munich and was the only son of Prince Konrad of Bavaria and his wife Princess Maria Bona of Savoy-Genoa. Eugen's older sister was Princess Amalie Isabella of Bavaria, born 1921.

Marriage
On 16 November 1970, Prince Eugen married Countess Helene of Khevenhüller-Metsch (4 April 1921 in Vienna – 25 December 2017 in Bad Hindelang), daughter of Count Franz of Khevenhüller-Metsch and Princess Anna of Fürstenberg. Countess Helene was previously married to Prince Konstantin of Bavaria, who lost his life in a plane crash on 30 July 1969. The civil ceremony took place in Munich and the religious wedding followed five days later in Innsbruck, Austria. The couple did not have any children together, but Helene had a daughter from her previous marriage.

Later life
The prince was a Grand Prior of the Bavarian Order of Saint George, Knight of the Order of Saint Hubert and a Knight of the Sovereign Military Order of Malta.

Death
Prince Eugen of Bavaria died on 1 January 1997 at Grasse in the Alpes-Maritimes region of France. He is buried at the Andechs Abbey cemetery in Bavaria.

Ancestry

References
 Die Wittelsbacher. Geschichte unserer Familie. Adalbert, Prinz von Bayern. Prestel Verlag, München, 1979
 The Book of Kings: A Royal Genealogy. C. Arnold McNaughton, in 3 volumes. London, U.K. Garnstone Press, 1973, volume 1, page 475
 Pedigrees of Some of the Emperor Charlemagne's Descendants. Marcellus Donald R. von Redlich, volume I, 1941; reprint, Baltimore, Maryland, U.S.A.: Genealogical Publishing Company, 2002, page 35.

Princes of Bavaria
House of Wittelsbach
1925 births
1997 deaths
German Roman Catholics
Burials at Andechs Abbey